Alfonso E. Lenhardt (born October 29, 1943) represented the United States as Ambassador to Tanzania from 2009 to 2013. He was also accredited as the US representative to the East African Community (EAC) in 2010. He left his post in October 2013. From 2001 to 2003, he served as Sergeant at Arms of the United States Senate. From 1965 to 1997, he had a distinguished military career in the U.S. Army, with multiple assignments to various parts of the world, retiring as a highly decorated Major General.

Born in New York City, Lenhardt earned a B.S. degree in Criminal Justice from the University of Nebraska. Lenhardt later received an M.A. degree in Public Administration from Central Michigan University and an M.S. degree in the Administration of Justice from Wichita State University.

Commissioned as an infantry officer in October 1966, Lenhardt commanded a platoon in Vietnam, earning a Bronze Star Medal, a Purple Heart and two Air Medals. After returning to the United States, he continued his career commanding and training military police detachments. Approved for promotion to major general in August 1993, he retired from active duty in August 1997. Among his other military honors were the Distinguished Service Medal, Defense Superior Service Medal, two awards of the Legion of Merit and three awards of the Meritorious Service Medal.

On September 18, 2014, Lenhardt was confirmed to be the Deputy Administrator of the Agency for International Development. Following the departure of USAID Administrator Rajiv Shah in February 2015, Lenhardt assumed the role of acting administrator. Gayle Smith, President Barack Obama's nominee to be Shah's permanent successor, was confirmed by the Senate on November 30, 2015, and assumed the role of administrator on December 2, 2015.

Cumulatively, Lenhardt served over 40 years in various government positions throughout his career. Beginning with his service as a young U.S. Army draftee in 1965, he had increasingly higher levels of responsibility and distinction in service to the Nation.

References

External links

See also
United States Ambassador to Tanzania
Embassy of United States, Tanzania

|-

|-

1943 births
Living people
People from Manhattan
University of Nebraska–Lincoln alumni
United States Army personnel of the Vietnam War
Recipients of the Air Medal
Central Michigan University alumni
Wichita State University alumni
Recipients of the Meritorious Service Medal (United States)
Recipients of the Legion of Merit
United States Army generals
Recipients of the Defense Superior Service Medal
Recipients of the Distinguished Service Medal (US Army)
Sergeants at Arms of the United States Senate
African-American diplomats
Ambassadors of the United States to Tanzania
21st-century American politicians
Administrators of the United States Agency for International Development
20th-century African-American people
21st-century African-American politicians